Sales are the activities involved in selling products or services. See also Sales (accounting), operating revenues earned by a company when it sells its products.

Sales may also refer to:

 Sales (surname), a list of people so named
 Sales, São Paulo, a municipality in the state of São Paulo, Brazil
 Sales, Haute-Savoie, a village and commune in the Haute-Savoie département, France
 Château de Sales, a ruined castle
 Sales (Colunga), a parish in the province of Asturias, Spain
 Sâles, a municipality in the canton of Fribourg, Switzerland
 Sales, Sarine, a village in the canton of Fribourg, Switzerland

Music
 Record sales
 SALES (band), a band from Orlando, Florida

See also
 Salesians, a religious order named after Francis de Sales 
Sale (disambiguation)
 Salesman (disambiguation)